Thomas Murphy (1943 – 14 November 2022) was an Irish hurler. He played for his local club Rower–Inistioge and was a member of the Kilkenny senior inter-county team from 1963 until 1969.

Death
Thomas Murphy died on 14 November 2022, at the age of 80.

Playing career

Rower–Inistioge

Murphy began his hurling career at club level with Rower–Inistioge. After coming to prominence as an 11-year-old member of the club's successful under-14 team, he progressed through the juvenile and underage ranks before eventually joining the club's senior team. The high point of Murphy's club career occurred on 27 April 1969 when he claimed a Kilkenny Senior Championship title after a 3-09 to 3-07 defeat of Bennettsbridge in the 1968 final.

Kilkenny

Minor and intermediate
Murphy first played for Kilkenny as a 16-year-old when he was drafted onto the minor team for the 1960 Leinster Championship. He won a Leinster Minor Championship medal in his debut year after the 6-14 to 5-05 win over Wexford. Murphy later won an All-Ireland medal after scoring a hat-trick of goals in the 7-12 to 1-11 final defeat of Tipperary.

After missing the following year's minor championship due to his priesthood studies, Murphy was drafted onto the Kilkenny intermediate team for the 1963 Leinster Championship.

Senior
Murphy's performance in the intermediate grade drew the attention of the senior selectors and he was one of a number of players promoted to the Kilkenny senior team prior to the start of the 1963 Leinster Championship. He made his first appearance in the senior ranks on 7 July 1963 when he scored a goal in a 4-09 to 3-08 defeat of Wexford. Murphy subsequently lined out in his first Leinster final and claimed his first winners' medal after the 2-10 to 0-09 defeat of Dublin. On 1 September 1963, he was selected at left corner-forward against Waterford in an All-Ireland final. He scored 2-01 from play and claimed his first All-Ireland medal after the 4-17 to 6-08 victory.

After collecting a second consecutive provincial title after the 4-11 to 1-08 defeat of Dublin in the 1964 Leinster final, Murphy lined out in a second consecutive All-Ireland final on 6 September 1964. In spite of being regarded as the favourites, Kilkenny ended the game as runners-up after a 5-13 to 2-08 defeat by Tipperary.

Murphy claimed his third provincial winners' medal as a substitute after a 1-15 to 2-06 defeat of Wexford in the 1966 Leinster final. On 4 September 1966, he again started the game on the bench when Kilkenny faced Cork in the All-Ireland final. Murphy was introduced as a substitute for Pa Dillon at full-forward but ended on the losing side after a 3-09 to 1-10 defeat.

Murphy's priesthood studies impacted on his hurling career on a number of occasions over the following years, however, he claimed his fourth provincial winners' medal after lining out as a substitute in the 3-09 to 0-16 defeat of Offaly in the final. On 7 September 1969, Murphy was again included amongst the substitutes when he claimed his second All-Ireland winners' medal after the 2-15 to 2-09 victory over Cork. It was his last major game with the Kilkenny senior team.

References

1943 births
2022 deaths
Rower-Inistioge hurlers
Kilkenny inter-county hurlers
All-Ireland Senior Hurling Championship winners